BNU may refer to:
BNU (software), a communications driver.
Banco Nacional Ultramarino, a Portuguese and Macanese bank
Beaconhouse National University, Lahore
Beijing Normal University, a university in Beijing, China
Bibliothèque nationale et universitaire, public library in Strasbourg
Brooklyn Northern United AFC, a New Zealand football team
Buckinghamshire New University, a university in Buckinghamshire, England
Bengaluru North University, a university in Karnataka, India